Templeton, Angus is a rural area to the north west of Dundee, Scotland, UK, close to Camperdown House.

See also
List of places in Angus

Villages in Angus, Scotland